Frank Thomas (6 March 1924 – 20 November 2010) was a Barbadian cricketer. He played in one first-class match for the Barbados cricket team in 1944/45.

See also
 List of Barbadian representative cricketers

References

External links
 

1924 births
2010 deaths
Barbadian cricketers
Barbados cricketers
People from Saint Michael, Barbados